China United Airlines Co., Ltd. is a low-cost carrier and a subsidiary of China Eastern Airlines with its headquarters and main hub on the grounds of Beijing Daxing International Airport in Daxing District, Beijing, operating scheduled flights and charter services in co-operation with local enterprises out of Daxing Airport. In 2019, China United Airlines' painted aircraft won TOP.01 at the World Classic Aircraft Award.

History 
China United Airlines was established in 1986 as an arm of the civil transport division of the People's Liberation Army Air Force. In November 2002, all scheduled services were ceased, followed by a full suspension of flight operations in 2003 due to a Chinese governmental regulation prohibiting the Army from being directly involved in commercial activities. On June 4, 2005, the Civil Aviation Administration of China approved the relaunch of the airline. Now with Shanghai Airlines holding 80 percent of the stake, as well as CASGC as a secondary shareholder. Even though China United Airlines has since then lost its military status, uniquely enough for an airline it is still permitted to use military air base as destinations, in contrast to other Chinese airlines and other airlines in general.

In 2000, China United Airlines spent US$120 million to buy a Boeing 767-300ER, which was previously ordered by Delta, as Jiang Zemin's private jet. Several days before its first flight, covert listening devices were found installed in toilet, corridor, and even in Jiang's headboard. Listening device were believed to be controlled and monitored by satellite. CIA, U.S embassy in China, and China United Airlines refuse to comment on this incident. The specific aircraft was sold to Air China and later to Sunday Airlines of Kazakhstan.

China United Airlines was acquired by China Eastern Airlines in October 2010 as a result of acquisitions.

With the opening of the Beijing Daxing International Airport on 26 September 2019, China United Airlines began service at the new airport as its main hub and ceased service from Beijing Nanyuan Airport which was its main operating base for 35 years.

Corporate affairs
The headquarters is on the grounds of Beijing Daxing International Airport in Daxing District, Beijing. Previously the headquarters were in Fengtai District.

The customer service center is in Xinhua District, Shijiazhuang, Hebei.

Destinations

China 
Anhui
Fuyang (Fuyang Airport)
Hefei (Hefei Xinqiao International Airport)
Beijing
Beijing (Beijing Daxing International Airport) Hub
Fujian
Fuzhou (Fuzhou Changle International Airport)
Longyan (Longyan Guanzhishan Airport)
Guangdong
Guangzhou (Guangzhou Baiyun International Airport)
Foshan (Foshan Shadi Airport)
Shenzhen (Shenzhen Baoan International Airport)
Jieyang (Jieyang Chaoshan International Airport)
Zhanjiang (Zhanjiang Wuchuan Airport)
Hainan
Sanya (Sanya Fenghuang International Airport)
Henan
Nanyang (Nanyang Jiangying Airport)
Hunan
Changsha (Changsha Huanghua International Airport)
Inner Mongolia
Baotou (Baotou Airport)
Hailar (Hailar Dongshan Airport)
Hohhot (Hohhot Baita International Airport)
Ordos (Ordos Airport)
Jiangsu
Wuxi (Wuxi Shuofang Airport)
Lianyungang (Lianyungang Baitabu Airport)
Nanjing (Nanjing Lukou Airport)
Jiangxi
Ganzhou (Ganzhou Airport)
Shaanxi
Yulin (Yulin Airport)
Shandong
Linyi (Linyi Airport)
Shanghai
Shanghai (Shanghai Hongqiao International Airport)
Shanghai (Shanghai Pudong International Airport)
Sichuan
Chengdu (Chengdu Shuangliu International Airport)
Xinjiang
Ürümqi (Ürümqi Diwopu International Airport)
Zhejiang
Hangzhou (Hangzhou Xiaoshan International Airport)
Quzhou (Quzhou Airport)

Japan 
 Fukuoka
Fukuoka (Fukuoka Airport)
 Shizuoka
Shizuoka (Shizuoka Airport)

Fleet 

, the China United Airlines fleet consists of the following aircraft:

The airline previously operated the following aircraft:

Special liveries
China United Airlines has a total of 7 special livery aircraft in service, all of which are named after cities in China:
 B-5448 (Boeing 737-800) – named and decorated after Huangguoshu Waterfall, Anshun, Guizhou
 B-5665 (Boeing 737-800) – named and decorated after Baotou, Inner Mongolia
 B-5470 (Boeing 737-800) – named and decorated after Rizhao, Shandong
 B-7561 (Boeing 737-800) – named and decorated after Xingyi, Guizhou
 B-5471 (Boeing 737-800) – named and decorated after Qingyang, Gansu
 B-1750 (Boeing 737-800) – named and decorated after Lianyungang, Jiangsu
 B-7371 (Boeing 737-800) – named and decorated after Wuhu, Anhui

References

External links 

 Official website 
 English about page /

Airlines of China
Airlines established in 1986
Chinese companies established in 1986
Companies based in Beijing
Chinese brands
Former Star Alliance affiliate members
Low-cost carriers
People's Liberation Army Air Force